In baseball statistics, a putout (denoted by PO or fly out when appropriate) is given to a defensive player who records an out by tagging a runner with the ball when he is not touching a base, catching a batted or thrown ball and tagging a base to put out a batter or runner (a force out), catching a thrown ball and tagging a base to record an out on an appeal play, catching a third strike (a strikeout), catching a batted ball on the fly (a fly out), or being positioned closest to a runner called out for interference. Third base, or 3B, is the third of four stations on a baseball diamond which must be touched in succession by a baserunner in order to score a run for that player's team. A third baseman is the player on the team playing defense who fields the area nearest third base, and is responsible for the majority of plays made at that base. The third baseman requires good reflexes in reacting to batted balls, often being the closest infielder (roughly 90–120 feet) to the batter. The third base position requires a strong and accurate arm, as the third baseman often makes long throws to first base. The third baseman sometimes must throw quickly to second base in time to start a double play, and must also field fly balls in both fair and foul territory. In the scoring system used to record defensive plays, the third baseman is assigned the number 5.

Third basemen typically record putouts by stepping on third base after receiving a throw from another infielder or the pitcher to force out a runner on a ground out, by catching a pop-up or line drive, or by fielding a ground ball close enough to third base that they can step on the bag for a force out before the runner advances from second base. Other ways in which third basemen often record a putout include receiving a throw from an outfielder to tag a runner trying to reach third base, tagging a runner after a throw from the catcher or pitcher on a stolen base attempt or a pickoff play, receiving a throw to retire a runner who fails to tag up on a fly ball out, receiving a throw to force out a runner on a bunt (possibly a sacrifice hit attempt), and tagging a runner stranded between bases in a rundown play. Because fewer runners advance to third base than to the preceding bases, because of the higher difficulty of throwing out a runner taking a lead off second base, and because there are far fewer attempts to steal third base than second base, third basemen generally record far fewer putouts than any other players except pitchers. Occasionally, a third baseman can record two putouts on a single play; with a runner taking a lead off third base and less than two out, the third baseman can catch a line drive near the base, then step on the bag before the runner can return, completing a double play;  alternately, if a runner on second base breaks for third base when the ball is hit, the third baseman can catch a line drive and tag the runner before they can stop and return to second.

As strikeout totals have risen in baseball, the frequency of other defensive outs including ground outs has declined; as a result, putout totals for third basemen have likewise declined, and all but three of the top 25 career leaders began their careers prior to 1961 even though career lengths for third basemen have steadily increased since 1920; eight of the top 13 began their careers before 1925. Through 2022, only four of the top 63 single-season totals have been recorded since 1929, only four of the top 138 since 1957, and only six of the top 499 since 1976. Brooks Robinson is the all-time leader in career putouts as a third baseman with 2,697; he is the only third baseman with more than 2,500 career putouts.

Key

List

Stats updated as of the end of the 2022 season.

Other Hall of Famers

Notes

References

External links

Major League Baseball statistics
Putouts as a third baseman